Albert Shutt (born 21 September 1952) is an English former first-class cricketer who played a handful of times for Worcestershire in the early 1970s. He was born in Stockton-on-Tees, County Durham.

He had a short run in the first team in 1972 after taking 5/41 and 3/29 against Glamorgan seconds, and played a single one-day match the following season, taking four wickets in first-class and List A games combined. His wickets taken were those of Malcolm Nash and Basher Hassan in the County Championship, and Gordon Greenidge and Roger Prideaux in the John Player League. As a batsman, Shutt played 24 innings at first- and second-team level, scoring a total of 35 runs with a highest score of 8.

Shutt played one Minor Counties Championship match for his native Durham, against Cheshire in 1977. He took 1/55 and 0/39, and didn't bat in either innings. In 1995, he joined Richmondshire Cricket Club in the North Yorkshire and South Durham League.

References

External links
 

1952 births
Living people
English cricketers
Worcestershire cricketers
Durham cricketers